Adalberto Garelli (July 10, 1886 - January 13, 1968) was an Italian engineer and entrepreneur who patented a gearbox and a Split-single engine engine. Garelli founded the motorcycle company Garelli Motorcycles in 1919.

Education
Garelli graduated from college with a degree in engineering in 1909.

Business career
After graduating with an engineering degree in 1909, Garelli went to work for Fiat. Garelli left Fiat in 1911 when they did not express interest in his ideas for a 2 stroke motor. Between 1911 and 1919 Garelli worked for several motorcycle companies: Bianchi and Stucchi. During this time Garelli patented a 3 speed gearbox and a 2 stroke 2 cylinder engine.

From 1911-1914, Garelli patented a split single engine which used a single connecting rod and long wrist pin which passed through both pistons. He produced a  split-single motorcycle engine for road use and racing from 1918-1926.

By 1919 Garelli started his own motorcycle engine company named Garelli. In the 1960's and 1980's Garelli's motorcycle company won many awards for long distance and Grand Prix motorcycle racing.

Honors
From 1930-1933 Garelli was the President of the Italian Cycling Federation.

References 

Engineers from Turin
1886 births
1968 deaths
Italian inventors
Italian motorcycle designers
Italian company founders
20th-century Italian engineers
Bianchi (company)
Fiat people